Filmax International is a Spanish motion picture production company and film distributor based in Barcelona, and one of Spain's largest integrated film and television groups. It produced the REC horror series, and owns the Nirvana Films and New World Films International distributors and the Fantastic Factory label, dedicated to create fantasy films in the horror, science fiction and action genres.

At different times, Filmax has entered into distribution agreements with Paramount, Lauren Films, Lakeshore, Summit, Fintage House, Nu lmage, Annapurna and Freeway.

History 
The company was founded in 1953 by Alfredo Talarewitz, as a distributor of Hollywood films. From 1955 onwards, it collaborated with Spanish production company .

The Filmax trademark was acquired in 1987 by Julio Fernández.

In 2019, Filmax had distributed over 800 films.

References

External links

 
Film production companies of Spain
Film production companies of the United States
Film distributors of Spain
Home video companies of the United States
1953 establishments in Spain

Mass media companies established in 1953